Severance is a 2018 science fiction novel by Chinese-American author Ling Ma. It follows Candace Chen, an unfulfilled Bible product coordinator, before and after an incurable infection slowly obliterates global civilization. Severance explores themes of nostalgia, modern office culture, monotony, and intimate relationships. The novel, Ma's debut, won the 2018 Kirkus Prize for Fiction and was included on many prominent Best Books of 2018 lists.

Setting 
Severance takes place in an alternate history of the United States up to the end of 2011, before and during a pandemic of the fictional Shen Fever, a fictional fungal infection caused by Sheniodioides originating in Shenzhen, China. Real world events such as Occupy Wall Street unfold differently due to the Shen Fever pandemic.

People infected with Shen Fever repeat old routines compulsively, without consciousness and until death. There is no cure for the fever, and its spread eventually leads to total societal collapse in the United States. Some people are inexplicably immune to the fever and try to survive during the slow apocalypse.

Plot 
The narrative follows Candace Chen after societal collapse due to the Shen Fever pandemic and in flashbacks to her earlier life. Candace and her parents emigrate from Fuzhou, China to Salt Lake City in her youth. In her twenties, Candace drifts through New York City, living on her inheritance from her parents following their deaths, before getting an unfulfilling job at a Manhattan-based publishing company called Spectra, overseeing the production of elaborate design variations of the Bible. In the early days of the pandemic in 2011, Candace discovers she is pregnant after splitting with her boyfriend, Jonathan. As businesses shut down as the pandemic worsens, Candace accepts a lucrative contract with Spectra to be one of the few to continue to work in the office until a certain date, because having a workplace open is good for the company's image. Having no living family to be with in the US, Candace feels little drive to flee the city as most others do. Eventually she is the only employee left and is no longer contacted by her superiors. Per Jonathan's parting suggestion to revive her old pursuits in photography, she documents the final days of a deserted New York City's collapsing infrastructure on a blog called NY Ghost. When shocked by the realization that she has fulfilled her work contract, Candace is one of the final survivors to escape the city in late 2011.

In the present, a group of other immune survivors finds Candace near death in a New York taxi cab on the shoulder of a highway in Pennsylvania. The quasi-religious group, under the domineering leadership of Bob, is traveling towards "the Facility," which Bob promises to be safe. On the way there, the group follows Bob's rituals to "stalk" houses for supplies, killing the "fevered" people inside. A member of the group who was seemingly healthy succumbs to Shen Fever while visiting her childhood home, leading Candace to theorize that nostalgia is somehow related to the mindless routines of the fevered. The survivors arrive to find that the Facility is an abandoned shopping mall in suburban Illinois, which Bob co-owns and spent much of his youth in, and begin to make a new home there. As punishment for rebellion and due to the discovery of Candace's pregnancy, Bob has her imprisoned. Candace begins to hallucinate the presence of her dead mother, who helps her realize that her safety is only ensured until the birth of her baby. When Candace finds Bob in his nightly routine of walking around the mall, now fevered, she is able to steal his keys and escape. Candace takes a car and heads for Chicago, planning for the future.

Characters 

 Candace Chen: A young woman originally from Fuzhou, Fujian province, China, residing in New York when Shen Fever strikes. Employed at a publishing company called Spectra, Candace is the production assistant in the Bible department. She is also a photographer and secret creator of the NY Ghost blog.

Pre-pandemic 

 Jonathan: Candace's boyfriend for most of the five years she lives in New York City. Jonathan is a disillusioned free spirit, who temps and freelances for enough money to get by. He aspires to write fiction.
 Ruifang Yang: Candace's mother. Worked as an accountant in China, before moving to the U.S. for her husband's graduate degree.
 Zhigang Chen: Candace's father, an insurance analyst.
 Jane: Candace's NYU roommate.
 Blythe: a Spectra employee in the Art Books department.
 Lane: Senior Product Coordinator in Art at Spectra.
 Seth: Candace's boss, the Senior Product Coordinator of Gifts and Specialty at Spectra. 
 Manny: Doorman at Spectra.
 Michael Reitman: CEO of Spectra.
 Steven Reitman: an author with whom Candace hooks up. He helps her get the Spectra job through his connection with the CEO.
 Carole: Human Resources at Spectra.
 Delilah: a Spectra employee in the Art Books department.
 Balthasar: an operations director at Phoenix Sun and Moon Ltd.
 Edgar: The secondary operations director at Phoenix Sun and Moon Ltd.

During the pandemic 

 Eddie: A taxi driver who drives Candace to the Spectra offices.

Post-pandemic 

 Robert "Bob" Eric Reamer: A former I.T. guy who has become the ruthless, quasi-religious leader of the traveling survivor group.
 Janelle Sasha Smith: A brave, thoughtful survivor who befriends Candace.
 Adam Patrick Robinson: A member of the survivor group.
 Evan Drew Marcher: One of the small subgroup of survivors which makes a pact to leave the Facility.
 Rachel Sara Aberdeen: A member of the survivor group.
 Genevieve Elyse Goodwin: A member of the survivor group.
 Ashley Martin Piker: A member of the survivor group, who becomes fevered when she returns to her childhood home. She is later killed by Bob.
 Todd Henry Gaines: A member of the survivor group.

Themes 
The New York Times''' review stated that Severance, "offers blatant commentary on 'dizzying abundance' and unrelenting consumption, evolving into a semi-surreal sendup of a workplace and its utopia of rules." Ling Ma began the novel while working as a fact checker for Playboy, a job she held from 2009 to 2012. It began as a short story, written in her office during her last few months there; after her layoff, it became a novel which she wrote while living on severance pay. She took four years to write it, and finished the novel at Cornell as part of the work in her MFA program. She said that she watched George Romero films while working on Severance, and also The Walking Dead.

Ma said she "felt pressured to write a traditional immigration novel" while in the MFA program at Cornell, but instead decided to write about otherness and alienation via the trope of zombie apocalypse. Ma's main character is, like her, a first generation immigrant. The New York Times review states that "laced within its dystopian narrative is an encapsulation of a first-generation immigrant’s nostalgia for New York."

 Reception 
It was a New York Times Notable Book of 2018. NPR's Michael Schaub said, "A fierce debut from a writer with seemingly boundless imagination" and "A stunning, audacious book with a fresh take on both office politics and what the apocalypse might bring." The Chicago Tribune called it, "a gripping bildungsroman in the midst of an apocalypse."

It was included on annual Best Book lists at Elle, Marie Claire, Refinery29, Buzzfeed, BookPage, Bookish, Mental Floss, Huffington Post, A.V. Club, Jezebel, and Vulture. Electric Literature included it on a list of possible winners for the 2019 Pulitzer Prize for Fiction.BookPage called it, "astounding debut novel." Refinery29 included it on a list of Post-Apocalyptic Books Will Freak You Out, saying, "Ma creates a convincing portrait of a woman slightly disconnected from the world, even before the virus."

According to the review aggregator Book Marks, Severance received "rave" reviews, based on 19 reviews.

 Awards Severance'' was awarded the 2018 Kirkus Prize for Fiction and the 2019 NYPL Young Lions Fiction Award. It was a finalist for 2019 the PEN/Hemingway award.

References 

2018 science fiction novels
Satirical novels
Apocalyptic novels
American science fiction novels
Novels set in the 2010s
Zombie novels
Feminist science fiction
Literature by women
Literature by Asian-American women
Debut science fiction novels
2018 debut novels
Farrar, Straus and Giroux books
Kirkus Prize-winning works
Fictional fungi
Fiction about diseases and disorders